The Women's 500 metre Time Trial C4-5 track cycling event at the 2016 Summer Paralympics took place on September 10. 14 riders competed. Kadeena Cox of Great Britain took the gold medal in a new C4 world record. In doing so, she became the first British paralympian in 24 years to win medals in two different sports at the same Games, having already won a bronze medal in athletics in the women's 100 metres T38 event.

Results

References

Cycling at the 2016 Summer Paralympics